Setrobuvir (also known as ANA-598) was an experimental drug candidate for the treatment of hepatitis C that was discovered at Anadys Pharmaceuticals, which was acquired by  Roche in 2011; Roche terminated development in July 2015.  It was in Phase IIb clinical trials, used in combination with interferon and ribavirin, targeting hepatitis C patients with genotype 1.

Setrobuvir works by inhibiting the hepatitis C enzyme NS5B, an RNA polymerase.

References

Abandoned drugs
NS5B (polymerase) inhibitors
Sulfonamides